Club Atlético River Plate, commonly known as River Plate, is an Argentine professional 
sports club based in the Núñez neighborhood of Buenos Aires. Founded in 1901, the club is named after the English name for the city's estuary, Río de la Plata. Although many sports are practised at the club, River Plate is best known for its professional football team, which has won Argentina's Primera División championship a record of 37 times, its latest title in 2021. Domestic achievements also include 14 national cups, with the 2021 Trofeo de Campeones as the most recent, making River Plate the country's most successful team in domestic competitions with a total of 51 top-division titles.

At international level, River Plate has won 18 titles, with 12 organised by CONMEBOL and other international bodies. River Plate's official international achievements include four Copa Libertadores, one Intercontinental Cup, one Supercopa Sudamericana, one Copa Sudamericana, three Recopa Sudamericana, one Copa Interamericana and one Suruga Bank Championship. Furthermore, the club has also won six tournaments organized by AFA and AUF together: five Copa Dr. Ricardo Aldao, and one Tie Cup. In addition, River Plate's reserve team won the U-20 Copa Libertadores in 2012. River Plate is the first and only team to simultaneously hold CONMEBOL's three current major international competitions, after winning the 2014 Copa Sudamericana, 2015 Recopa Sudamericana and the 2015 Copa Libertadores.

In a survey published by the Argentine Football Association in 2016, 6 out of 11 players in the all-time Argentina national team had played for River Plate. The club placed ninth in the FIFA Club of the Century poll in December 2000, and in 2010, the International Federation of Football History & Statistics also placed River Plate in ninth place in a list of the best teams in the world during the 1990s and 2000s, ranking as the top South American club. Among other achievements, River Plate is at the top of the list in the All-time Argentine Primera División table, being the Argentine team with most games won, fewest losses, most points accumulated, most goals scored, fewest goals against and best goal difference since the first championship held in 1891, and is first in the Historical table of the Copa Libertadores, being the South American team with most games won.

River has a fierce rivalry with Boca Juniors. Matches between them are known as Superclásico, and the two teams' rivalry is amongst the most heated in the sport, due to their local and global popularity. River's home stadium, Estadio Monumental is the largest in South America. Apart from football, the club hosts a large variety of sports such as athletics, basque pelota, bowls, chess, basketball, handball, cestoball, gymnastics, field hockey, karate, roller hockey, roller skating, swimming, taekwondo, tennis, volleyball, waterpolo, and eSports.

History

According with the club's official version, River Plate was founded on 25 May 1901,  close to the La Boca neighborhood (later the home of fierce rivals Boca Juniors). The institution was formed after the merger of two clubs, "Santa Rosa" and "La Rosales", with Leopoldo Bard being elected as its first president. The name was chosen because of an incident during the construction of Buenos Aires Port: one of the members had seen how the workers of Dique nº 3 left their duties for a while to play a football match. The boxes they were working with just said "The River Plate" (the name the English gave to the Río de la Plata) and that inscription was taken to name the new club.

River Plate affiliated to the Argentine Football Association in 1905, debuting in the third division against Facultad de Medicina. On 13 December 1908, the team was promoted to first division after beating Racing Club 2–1. However, the match was declared null due to River supporters jumping onto the field to celebrate with the players, so a new match had to be played. River again won, this time 7–0, to achieve promotion.

In 1914 River won its first domestic championship, the Copa de Competencia Jockey Club and its first international title, the Copa de Competencia Chevallier Boutell. The nickname Los Millonarios came after the acquisition of winger Carlos Peucelle in 1931 for $10,000 and Bernabé Ferreyra for $35,000 (Large sum of money for the period) in 1932.

In the following years, River Plate consolidated its place as one of the most popular teams of Argentina, and the 20th century brought much success. The club's record of 28 official tournaments saw them dubbed El Campeón del Siglo (The Champions of the Century).

Kit

Kit evolution

Notes

Kit suppliers and shirt sponsors 
Adidas has been River Plate's uniform supplier since 1982, becoming one of the company's largest sponsorship deals in the world, only behind German club Bayern Munich. The US$60 million partnership with the German sports company signed in 2015 (extending the deal to 2021) marked the most expensive kit agreement in the history of Argentine football.

Badge

As in many football shirts and sports in general, the team's jersey has a badge on its front, as a symbol of the institution. When the River Plate jersey was created it did not have a badge, and its presence varied throughout the history, according to the designs of each era. Currently it is embroidered on the jersey, with three colors (red, white and black). Its format resembles that of the jersey, as it has a red stripe that crosses it, along with the acronym of the club (CARP) in black, and the background is white, in a stylized design.

When Hugo Santilli became chairman in 1984, he soon called to a competition where a new emblem would be chosen. The main objective of this new image was to eradicate the nickname Gallinas (Chicken) that River's rivals (Boca Juniors fans mainly) used to mock them. Artists from Argentina took part in that competition. The club finally chose a logo designed by the artist Caloi. This emblem showed the figure of a lion (wearing a River jersey) rising from the Monumental stadium. The lion logo was immediately added to the uniforms (on the field and training clothes) having River Plate won the Copa Libertadores de América and European/South American Cup using the lion logo. In 1989, when Santilli left the club so the lion went with him and has not been reestablished since.

In February 2022, River Plate launched its new corporate image, which included an update to the logo and a typography designed exclusively for the club. The corporate image was created and developed by "Grupo Berro", a branding and design studio that had been working on the corporate image for over two years.

Rivalry

River Plate and Boca Juniors are the two largest football clubs in Argentina, with more than half the country's football fans supporting the clubs. Due to the rivalry between them, the Boca Juniors vs River Plate Superclásico local derby match was listed by the BBC as one of the most famous derbies in the world. It was also acclaimed in 2004 as the number one of the Fifty sporting things you must do before you die by The Observer newspaper.

Club nicknames

The "River Plate" name was chosen in 1901, when the team was still located at the La Boca neighbourhood, next to the Río de la Plata ("River Plate" in some English sources). Proposed names as "Club Atlético Forward", "Juventud Boquense" or "La Rosales" had been rejected. Pedro Martínez saw the name "The River Plate" written at ship containers, and proposed it as a name, which was finally accepted as the official name.

River fans and the press are fond of the nickname Los Millonarios (The Millionaires). This name derives from the 1930s after some expensive transfers of players from other clubs, including Carlos Peucelle from Sportivo Buenos Aires in 1931 and Bernabé Ferreyra from Tigre in 1932.

Due to the red band in their shirt, it is also common to refer to River as El Equipo de la Banda (the team with the band) or simply La Banda (which means "the stripe", but can also mean "the band" -both as in "gang" and "musical group"). River Plate's forwards between 1941 and 1946 were given the nickname La Máquina (The Machine), due to their synchronization and movements on the field.

There was also a River Plate team that was known as La Maquinita (The Little Machine, as tribute to its predecessor) in the 1950s. Managed by José María Minella, the team earned the nickname after winning five championships in six years (1952–57). Some notable players were Alfredo Di Stéfano, Santiago Vernazza, Walter Gómez, Enrique Omar Sívori, among others. Some members of the original Máquina of the 1940s such as Labruna and Loustau, were also part of the team.

Stadiums

The Estadio Antonio Liberti (nicknamed El Monumental) placed in Belgrano neighborhood of Buenos Aires is River Plate's stadium. With a capacity of 65,645, it was inaugurated on 25 May 1938. The Argentina national football team usually plays its home games at the stadium.

Since its establishment in 1901, River Plate stadiums has been:

 Dársena Sur (1901–05, 1907–15): Placed on the corner of Wenceslao Villafañe and Caboto streets of La Boca. The club returned in 1907 from Sarandí.
 Sarandí (1906–07): The club moved to that district in Greater Buenos Aires, near to railway station.
 La Boca (1915–23): River built a stadium on the corner of Pinzón and Gaboto streets in La Boca.
 Alvear y Tagle (1923–37): in the Recoleta district of Buenos Aires. The lands where the stadium was built had been owned by Juan Manuel de Rosas.
 Antonio V. Liberti (Monumental) (1938–present): Built on the same lands where the Bajo Belgrano Horse racing track had existed years ago.

Support 

In a research from a European sport marketing agency about the football teams with more members in the world, River Plate is in the sixth position, with 123,000 members, the highest in the Americas. The ranking is led by Barcelona of Spain and Benfica of Portugal. In a ranking made in 2018 by the Bundesliga about the football clubs with more members, River Plate appears in the sixth position with 146,000 members, surpassing clubs like FC Barcelona, Real Madrid CF and Manchester United F.C. among other football world powers.

On 8 October 2012, "The world's longest football flag" was unveiled in a caravan in which approximately 15,000 supporters took part. It was made entirely by fans who carried the 7,830 meters flag along the streets of Buenos Aires. The away jersey of the 2012–13 season was the most sold throughout the world during the month of September 2012, an achievement that had not reached any Argentine team. In 2015, the club participated in the FIFA Club World Cup and played against Sanfrecce Hiroshima at the Nagai Stadium in Osaka on 16 December, and on 20 December in the final against FC Barcelona at the International Stadium Yokohama. The number of River Plate supporters who traveled to Japan during that period were between 15,000 and 20,000, a record in the competition.

River Plate has official subsidiaries in provinces such as Santa Fe, Tucumán, Córdoba, Entre Ríos, Mendoza, Tierra del Fuego, Catamarca, among others, and in Spain, Mexico, Australia, the United States, Paraguay and Canada. There are also unofficial fan clubs in all Latin American countries, and also in Spain, Italy, England, Israel, Australia, Germany, the United States and New Zealand.

Players

Current squad

Out on loan

Top goalscorers

Most appearances

Youth academy 
From its creation in 1901 to the present, the lower divisions of River Plate have protagonized splendid moments in their categories.
The River Plate Academy is recognized on a continental and world level for the amount of talents that have emerged throughout it. River produced many of the best players in the history of football, including most of the institution's top idols. Its main objective is to supply players with great future to the first team and educate academically, ethically and athletically its members.
 Legends of football not only had the privilege of playing in the first division of the club Millonario, but also wore the red and white jersey since the youth categories. The lower divisions of River Plate, also known as "El Semillero" has always been the most fruitful of Argentina, the most important and also the one with the greatest success. Historically it is considered as the best soccer training school of the Americas and one of the best in the world.

Ballon d'Or winners 
Two players from the River Plate academy won the Ballon d'Or. Note: flags indicate national team they played for so the Ballon was awarded to European players only:
  Alfredo Di Stéfano (1957, 1959, 1989 Super Ballon d'Or)
  Omar Sívori (1961)

River Plate players ranked among the 50 best footballers in South America in the 20th century 
(according to a ranking made by IFFHS); Note: the ranking only includes River Plate players emerged from the youth academy:

Notable players who emerged from the River Plate Academy

  Pablo Aimar
  Matías Almeyda
  Norberto Alonso
  Julián Álvarez
  Leonardo Astrada
  Claudio Caniggia
  Amadeo Carrizo
  Fernando Cavenaghi
  Hernán Crespo
  Andrés D'Alessandro
  Martín Demichelis
  Ramón Díaz
  Alfredo Di Stéfano
  Radamel Falcao
  Enzo Fernández
  Marcelo Gallardo
  Gonzalo Higuaín
  Juan José López
  Ángel Labruna
  Erik Lamela
  Félix Loustau
  Oscar Más
  Javier Mascherano
  Reinaldo Merlo
  Gonzalo Montiel
  José Manuel Moreno
  Carlos Morete
  Mateo Musacchio
  Ermindo Onega
  Daniel Onega
  Ariel Ortega
  Exequiel Palacios
  Adolfo Pedernera
  Germán Pezzella
  Guido Rodríguez
  Néstor Rossi
  Javier Saviola
  Omar Sívori
  Santiago Solari
  Norberto Yácono

FIFA World Cup winners 

  Norberto Alonso (1978)
  Ubaldo Fillol (1978)
  Leopoldo Luque (1978)
  Oscar Ortiz (1978)
  Daniel Passarella (Captain 1978, DNP 1986)
  Héctor Enrique (1986)
  Nery Pumpido (1986)
  Oscar Ruggeri (1986)
  Franco Armani (2022)

Notable managers

Marcelo Gallardo is the club's most successful manager of all-time, with thirteen titles. Gallardo (appointed in 2014) is the current manager and under his direction, River Plate has won most of its international championships. Domestic titles won include three Copa Argentina (2015–16, 2016–17 and 2018–19) and two Supercopa Argentina (2017, 2019). He has been specially successful in the international scene, having won two Copa Libertadores (2015, 2018), one Copa Sudamericana (2014), three Recopa Sudamericana (2015, 2016, 2019), and one Suruga Bank Championship (2015). Several of these championship wins included memorable victories against archrivals Boca Juniors.

Ramón Díaz had three tenures on River Plate (1995–2000, 2001–02, and 2012–14), being the club's most successful manager in the domestic scene, having achieved six Primera División titles (1996–97 Torneo Apertura, 1996–97 Torneo Clausura, 1997–98 Torneo Apertura, 1999–2000 Torneo Apertura, 2001–02 Torneo Clausura, 2013–14 Torneo Final) and one Copa Campeonato (2014); internationally, he won the Copa Libertadores (1996) and one Supercopa Libertadores (1997).

José María Minella was another notable manager with eight titles won with River Plate, seven Primera División championships (1945, 1947, 1952, 1953, 1955, 1956, 1957) and one Copa Dr. Ricardo Aldao (1947).

Ángel Labruna had an outstanding career not only as player (he is club's all-time topscorer with 293 goals in 515 matches played), but as coach for the club, having won six Primera División championships (1975 Torneo Metropolitano, 1975 Torneo Nacional, 1977 Torneo Metropolitano, 1979 Torneo Nacional, 1979 Torneo Metropolitano, and 1980 Torneo Metropolitano).

Héctor Veira won the Copa Libertadores de América with River Plate, in 1986. That same year the team won the European/South American Cup played in Tokyo. Under his coaching the club also won the 1985–86 Argentine championship, totalizing three titles with River Plate.

Honours

Senior titles

Other titles 
Titles won in lower divisions:
 Primera B Nacional (1): 2011–12 
 Segunda División (2): 1908, 1934

Youth titles 
 U-20 Copa Libertadores (1)': 2012

 Friendly titles 
 Supercopa Euroamericana (1): 2015
 Torneo Internacional Nocturno: 1944 
 Copa Tres Ciudades: 1947 
 Torneo Triangular: 1962 
Copa Ciudad de Bogotá: 1964 
 Copa Confraternidad Iberoamericana: 1964
 Feria de Cali: 1965 
Copa Ciudad de Buenos Aires: 1969 
 Torneo Villa de Madrid: 1978 
 Torneo de Campeones: 1979 
 Torneo Cuadrangular Rosa de Oro de Querétaro: 1985 
 Copa 85th Aniversario: 1986 
 Copa Misiones: 1986 
 Copa Trasandina: 1992 
 Triangular Internacional Sodimac: 2022 

Notes

Other sports

Basketball

The basketball team currently plays in the Torneo Federal de Básquetbol. In 1950, the first FIBA World Championship was played in Buenos Aires and Argentina claimed the gold medal with 3 River Plate players: Alberto López, Leopoldo Contarbio and Vito Liva. The club won a Campeonato Argentino title in 1983, and finished in the 2nd place in the Campeonato Sudamericano de Clubes Campeones de Básquetbol in 1984.

The last edition of the Campeonato Argentino was held in that year, and River Plate was defeated in the finals, then playing at its successor competition, Liga Nacional de Básquetbol, between 1985–93 and 2004–06. The team reached the finals in 1988, and for the 1989 and 1990 seasons, Héctor Campana became the top scorer of the LNB, playing for River Plate. The team also achieved 2nd place in 2004 and 2005 editions of Copa Argentina. Since 2014, after eight years of absence in professional basketball, River Plate returned to national tournaments playing the CABB Federal Basketball Tournament.

Field hockey

The women's field hockey team is affiliated to the Buenos Aires Hockey Association (AHBA) and currently playing in Torneo Metropolitano A, the top division of regional hockey in Argentina.

In 2016, the squad (nicknamed Las Vikingas) won its first Metropolitano championship after beating Ciudad de Buenos Aires by 3–2 at the final.

In 2017, Las Vikingas'' won their third consecutive Hockey National League after defeating Club Italiano by 2–0 at the final, thus becoming one of the two clubs with most titles at the national tournament.

Two players from River Plate, Lucina von der Heyde and Bianca Donati, who were Junior World Champions in Chile 2016, made their debut in a world cup in London 2018. Von der Heyde was named the FIH Rising Star of the Year.

Futsal
The futsal team plays in the Argentine División de Honor. The team won three championships in 1991, 2002 and 2003, and two Copa Argentina de Futsal in 2016 and 2017. The team also achieved a third place in the Copa Libertadores de Futsal in 2013.

Handball
River is one of the founding clubs of the Federación Metropolitana de Balonmano (Fe.Me.Bal.) and it is also the institution that won more championships in local history.

All these titles have been obtained in the metropolitan and national levels, either in Metropolitan, Aperturas, Clausuras, Super 4 or Nacionales Tournaments, or the Federal League. The men's team won 32 domestic titles and the gold medal in the South American Men's Club Handball Championship in 1984. The team also achieved 2 Bronze medals in the same competition and 4 Bronze medals in the Pan American Men's Club Handball Championship. The women's team won 9 national titles, and the silver medal in the South American Women's Club Handball Championship in 1984 and the bronze medal in 1987.

The more prominent players in the club's history are Guillermo Till, Claudio Straffe, Freddy Ambrosini, Gabriel Canzoniero and Juan Ojea.

Swimming

The current swimming team has its origins in 2003, after many years in which the Club Atlético River Plate had no representatives in the national championships of this discipline.

The draft to form the best team in the country was led by Professor Rodolfo Sacco and had the best results that had never been achieved in the institution. The team began to form from a contractual relationship with the swimmer José Meolans, one of the Argentine swimmers with most titles won.

Many high-level swimmers, trained in other institutions began to approach to be part of what would be the best team in the country for the coming years.

Other swimmers from River Plate who represented Argentina in the Olympics include Meolans himself, Georgina Bardach, Eduardo Germán Otero, Walter Arciprete, Agustín Fiorilli, María del Pilar Pereyra, Juan Pereyra, Damián Blaum, Javiera Salcedo, Pablo Martín Abal, Cecilia Biagioli.

Tennis

Tennis is a sport practiced in River Plate since 1923. Currently, River Plate counts with 10 clay courts and one hard court. As in other disciplines, the Club stands out for its large number of teams participating in the official tournaments organized by the Asociación Argentina de Tenis, as well as having important activities and competitions for the development of this sport in the country.

Gabriela Sabatini, who is considered the best Argentine women's tennis player in history and an icon in national women's sport, began practicing at River at age 6, under the direction of Professor Daniel Fidalgo, with whom she trained for seven years. When she was 12 years old, she participated in the Mundialito Infantil de Caracas, winning the competition, and ratifying once again the talent she had already shown during his participation in metropolitan and national children's tournaments.

Volleyball

River Plate Women's division reached the national title four times, being one of the top champions of the league and the first to be champion three consecutive times (2005 to 2007).

The men's volleyball team won the Liga Argentina de Voleibol in the 1998–99 season with the Brazilians Jefferson, Marcos Dreyer, and the nationals Marcelo Román, Diego Gutiérrez and Luis Gálvez and the Súper 4 in 2003. The team also won 8 Metropolitan Leagues between 1956 and 2011.

Women's Football

The River Plate women's football team plays in the Campeonato de Fútbol Femenino and have won the championship 11 times of which five were in succession from 1993 to 1997. The team achieved the third place in the 2017 Copa Libertadores Femenina.

Other
In addition to the mentioned sports, River Plate's sections include artistic gymnastics, artistic roller skating, athletics, basque pelota, boxing, bowls, chess, karate, rhythmic gymnastics, roller hockey, taekwondo, table tennis and waterpolo.

Notes

References

External links

 

 
r
r
r
r
r
r
r
R
R
R
R
R